Kondovo Crisis took place in the village of Kondovo, Republic of Macedonia,
An armed group of young ethnic Albanians, allegedly former NLA guerrilla members, seal off the village of Kondovo, Republic of Macedonia, a suburb of the capital Skopje, citing poor conditions and repression by state authorities. The fledgling multi-ethnic governing coalition played down the incident stating it was a local problem stemming from the slow implementation of the peace agreement after the 2001 civil war, while some opposition parties called for "strong action".

See also
 Insurgency in the Republic of Macedonia

References

Conflicts in 2004
Conflicts in 2005
2004 in the Republic of Macedonia
2005 in the Republic of Macedonia
Albanian separatism